The Queensland Railways 8D11 class locomotive was a one locomotive class of 0-4-0+0-4-0 double boilered steam locomotive operated by the Queensland Railways.

History
In 1874, the Vulcan Foundry delivered a 0-4-0+0-4-0 locomotive to the Norwegian Government Railways who refused to accept it, After being rebuilt as works number 850, it was trialled by the Queensland Railways on the Ipswich to Toowoomba line and later purchased.

Numbered 41 it was named Governor Cairns. Per Queensland Railway's classification system it was designated the 8D11 class, 8 representing that it had eight driving wheels, D that it was a tank locomotive and the 11 the cylinder diameter in inches. It was scrapped in 1902.

References

Railway locomotives introduced in 1882
8D11
Vulcan Foundry locomotives
0-4-4-0 locomotives
3 ft 6 in gauge locomotives of Australia